Satellite in the Sky is a 1956 British CinemaScope science fiction film in Warner Color, produced by Edward J. Danziger and Harry Lee Danziger, directed by Paul Dickson, and starring Kieron Moore, Lois Maxwell, Donald Wolfit, and Bryan Forbes. The film was distributed by Warner Bros. Pictures. Special effects were by Wally Veevers, who would later work on Stanley Kubrick's 2001: A Space Odyssey (1968).

Plot
After initial experiments using high-speed aircraft are finally successful, scientists in Great Britain plan to launch the "Stardust", the first manned spaceship to venture into outer space. Some of the crew members have concerned loved ones. Barbara (Thea Gregory), the wife of Larry Noble (Jimmy Hanley), and Ellen (Shirley Lawrence), the girlfriend of radio operator Jimmy Wheeler (Bryan Forbes), are afraid that the space flight will be dangerous.

Although the crew, headed by Commander Michael Haydon (Kieron Moore), initially believe they are on a scientific mission, the "meteorologist" on board, Professor Merrity (Donald Wolfit), is revealed to be actually working for the United States to test an experimental nuclear "tritonium" bomb. The object is to use the super-powerful explosion to persuade nations to abandon nuclear weapons.

Complications arise when a crew member discovers a stowaway. Troublesome reporter Kim Hamilton (Lois Maxwell) who has been very vocal about the worth of the mission and of space exploration in general, had impulsively stowed away the night before to get a first-hand experience of the flight and its crew.

The tritonium bomb is released from the ship into space, but when its propulsion unit fails and the bomb magnetically attaches itself to the hull of the spaceship, everyone's life is threatened. The crew and their surprise guest race against time to defuse or escape the bomb.

Cast

 Kieron Moore as Commander Michael Haydon
 Lois Maxwell as Kim Hamilton
 Donald Wolfit as Professor Merrity
 Bryan Forbes as Jimmy Wheeler
 Jimmy Hanley as Larry Noble
 Barry Keegan as "Lefty" Blake  
 Donald Gray as Captain Ross
 Thea Gregory as Barbara Noble  
 Shirley Lawrence as Ellen  
 Alan Gifford as Colonel Galloway  
 Walter Hudd as Professor Blandford
 Carl Jaffe as Professor Bechstein
 Peter Neil as Tony
 Ryck Rydon as Reporter (credited as Rick Rydon)
 Ronan O'Casey as Reporter
 Robert O'Neil as Reporter

Production
Satellite in the Sky was the first British science fiction film to be shot in Cinemascope and WarnerColor. Footage of the Avro Vulcan and the Folland Midge, the prototype for the later Folland Gnat aircraft series, was featured in the beginning of the film, as scientists push the envelope of high-speed flight and test exotic rocket fuels. The Midge portrays a fictional jet fighter used to test an experimental fuel. Wally Veevers' extensive model work with miniatures and matte paintings is notable. The model rocket looks futuristic, though a familiar period design, using a long, angled ramp (à la When Worlds Collide) to launch the rocket into space.

Reception
Bosley Crowther of The New York Times described the weakness in the plot: "the trouble with this film is that it makes space travel so simple that it is without surprise or kick."

Film critic Leonard Maltin called Satellite in the Sky "elaborate but unexciting." The review in Video Movie Guide 2002 called it a "Tedious sci-fi adventure memorable for a fun performance by Donald Wolfit as the bomb's eccentric inventor."

See also
 List of American films of 1956

References

Notes

Citations

Bibliography

 Martin, Mick and Marsha Porter. Video Movie Guide 2002. New York: Ballantine Books, 2002. .

External links
 
 
 

1956 films
1950s science fiction films
CinemaScope films
British aviation films
British science fiction films
Films about astronauts
Films about nuclear war and weapons
Warner Bros. films
Films shot at New Elstree Studios
1950s English-language films
1950s British films